Nachrodt-Wiblingwerde is a municipality in the Märkischer Kreis, North Rhine-Westphalia, Germany.

Geography
The municipality is split into two main settlements. Nachrodt is located in the valley of the river Lenne at an altitude of 140 m above sea level, while Wiblingwerde is located at an altitude of 480 m on the hills of the Lennegebirge, one of the hill chains in the Sauerland mountains.

Division of the municipality

History
The municipality was formed in 1907, when the Amt Altena was dissolved. The two municipalities Kelleramt and Wiblingwerde were merged into the new municipality Nachrodt-Wiblingwerde, which was no longer member in an Amt anymore.

Coat of arms
The coat of arms of the municipality shows in the top part the red and silver rose from the church seal of the Kirchspiel Wiblingwerde. In the bottom is a wavy line representing the river Lenne and thus Nachrodt. Both symbols are separated by the red-and-silver chequered bar of the Mark. The coat of arms was designed by Otto Hupp, and was granted on October 17, 1935.

References

External links

 Official site 
 Tourist information 

Märkischer Kreis